Barg Sara (also Romanized as Barg Sarā; also known as Bargeh Sarā) is a village in Sheykh Neshin Rural District, Shanderman District, Masal County, Gilan Province, Iran. At the 2006 census, its population was 278, in 63 families.

References 

Populated places in Masal County